General Fisher may refer to:

Bertie Fisher (1878–1972), British Army lieutenant general
George A. Fisher Jr. (born 1942), U.S. Army lieutenant general
Louis Matshwenyego Fisher (fl. 1990s–2000s), Botswana Defence Force general

See also
General Fischer (disambiguation)
Attorney General Fisher (disambiguation)